Gareth Morton is a Scottish former professional rugby league footballer. He last played for the WA Reds in the 2009 Bundaberg Red Cup rugby league competition in Australia.

He has previously played for the Leeds Rhinos, Hull Kingston Rovers, Oldham RLFC (Heritage No. 1220), Doncaster RLFC, Widnes Vikings, WA Reds and Scotland.

Background
Morton was born in Perth, Scotland.

Career
Morton switched codes to play rugby union for Scottish Borders. Morton was called up to the senior Scotland union squad for the 2004 Six Nations Championship.

He was released by Hull KR on 17 September 2007.

He has been named in the Scotland training squad for the 2008 Rugby League World Cup.

He has been named in the Scotland squad for the 2008 Rugby League World Cup.

References

External links
RLWC08 profile
Profile at leedsrugby
Oldham R.L.F.C. profile
Rugby stats
Another coup as Oldham land Morton
The Dons sign Gareth Morton

1982 births
Living people
Border Reivers players
Doncaster R.L.F.C. players
Expatriate rugby league players in Australia
Footballers who switched code
Hull Kingston Rovers players
Leeds Rhinos players
Oldham R.L.F.C. players
Rugby league centres
Rugby league players from Perth, Scotland
Rugby league second-rows
Rugby union players from Perth, Scotland
Scotland national rugby league team players
Scottish expatriate rugby league players
Scottish expatriate sportspeople in Australia
Scottish rugby league players
Scottish rugby union players
WA Reds players
Widnes Vikings players